Haustrum scobina, or the oyster borer, is a species of predatory sea snail, a marine gastropod mollusk in the family Muricidae, the murex snails or rock snails. Oyster borers use a mucous layer that surrounds the entrance to their shell to prevent desiccation in the midlittoral and high tidal zones. Oyster Borers are frequently found in crevices which have more protection from predators, higher water availability, lower temperature, extremes in salinity and protection from the sun and wind.

Description
The length of the shell varies between 14 mm and 35 mm.

Distribution
It is endemic to New Zealand and is found off the North, South, Stewart and the Chatham Islands. This species generally prefers inter-tidal zones, such as the Hauraki Gulf of Auckland, New Zealand.

References

Further reading 
 Miller M & Batt G, Reef and Beach Life of New Zealand, William Collins (New Zealand) Ltd, Auckland, New Zealand 1973
 Powell A. W. B., New Zealand Mollusca, William Collins Publishers Ltd, Auckland, New Zealand 1979 
 Beu, A. G. 1990. Molluscan generic diversity of New Zealand Neogene stages: extinction and biostratigraphic events. – Palaeogeography, Palaeoclimatology, Palaeoecology 77: 279–288.
 Spencer, H.G., Marshall, B.A. & Willan, R.C. (2009). Checklist of New Zealand living Mollusca. Pp 196-219. in: Gordon, D.P. (ed.) New Zealand inventory of biodiversity. Volume one. Kingdom Animalia: Radiata, Lophotrochozoa, Deuterostomia. Canterbury University Press,

External links
 Quoy J.R.C. & Gaimard J.P. (1832-1835). Voyage de découvertes de l'"Astrolabe" exécuté par ordre du Roi, pendant les années 1826-1829, sous le commandement de M. J. Dumont d'Urville. Zoologie. 1: i-l, 1-264; 2(1): 1-321 [1832; 2(2): 321-686 [1833]; 3(1): 1-366 [1834]; 3(2): 367-954 [1835]; Atlas (Mollusques): pls 1-93 [1833]. Paris: Tastu]
 Dunker [W. & Zelebor J. 1866. Bericht über die von der Novara-Expedition mitgebrachten Mollusken. Verhandlungen der Kaiserlich-Königlichen Zoologisch-Botanischen Gesellschaft in Wien, 16: 909-916]
 Tan, K. S. 2003. Phylogenetic analysis and taxonomy of some southern Australian and New Zealand Muricidae (Mollusca: Neogastropoda). – Journal of Natural History 37: 911–1028
 Beu A.G. (2004) Marine Mollusca of oxygen isotope stages of the last 2 million years in New Zealand. Part 1: Revised generic positions and recognition of warm-water and cool-water migrants. Journal of the Royal Society of New Zealand 34(2): 111-265

Muricidae
Gastropods described in 1833
Gastropods of New Zealand